Colloblasts are unique, multicellular structures found in ctenophores. They are widespread in the tentacles of these animals and are used to capture prey. Colloblasts consist of a collocyte containing a coiled spiral filament, internal granules and other organelles.

Like the cnidocytes of cnidarians, colloblasts are discharged from the animals’ tentacles, and are used to capture prey. However, unlike cnidocytes, which are venomous cells, colloblasts contain adhesives which stick to, rather than sting the prey.

Form, function, and occurrence 
Colloblasts were first described in 1844.

The apical surface of colloblasts consist of numerous cap cells that secrete eosinophilic granules that are thought to be the source of adhesion. On contact, these granules rupture, and release an adhesive substance onto the prey. The spiral filament absorbs the impact of the rupture, preventing the ensnared prey from escaping. Colloblasts are found in all ctenophores except those of the order Beroida, which lack tentacles, and the species Haeckelia rubra, which use cnidocytes from cnidarian prey.

References
 

Animal cells
Histology